"Cabaret" is the title song of the 1966 musical of the same name, sung by the character Sally Bowles. It was composed by John Kander, with lyrics by Fred Ebb.

Background
In the musical, the song is performed by the character Sally Bowles in a night club setting in Weimar Germany in 1931.  Her lover has told her that he is taking her back to America so that they can raise their baby together in safety. Sally protests as she thinks their life in Berlin is wonderful and she states politics have nothing to do with them or their affairs. After a heated row, Sally goes on stage singing “Cabaret” (“life is a cabaret, old chum”), thus confirming her decision to live in carefree ignorance of the impending problems in Germany.

The version of the song used in the musical includes a verse beginning:
 
"I used to have a girlfriend known as Elsie 
With whom I shared
Four sordid rooms in Chelsea..."

The verse goes on to describe her friend's prostitution, alcoholism and early death. This section is often omitted in commercial recordings of the song by other artists, for example in the recording by Louis Armstrong.

Synopsis
A review by Robert Feldberg on NorthJersey.com explains Michelle Williams' interpretation of the song in the 2014 Broadway revival in relation to the musical's plot:

Critical reception
AllMusic wrote that the 1972 film "contains some definitive [Liza] Minnelli performances, particularly her rendition of the title song".

Reviews of the 2014 Broadway revival included: The Guardian described the song as "the hardest scene in the show, so shopworn as to have long ago collapsed into kitsch". Broadway World wrote Michelle Williams' "version of the title song has a wrenching, dead-eyed quality that hauntingly undercuts its light lyrics." It has been described as "stirring", "devastating", and "jaunty".

Notable recordings
Louis Armstrong (1966) - Armstrong's version was released together with "What a Wonderful World" in the UK, which reached No. 1 on the chart. "Cabaret" is listed together with "What a Wonderful World" in the chart.
Frankie Vaughan - (1966)
Steve Lawrence and Eydie Gormé - for their 1967 album Steve & Eydie – Together On Broadway
Mamie Van Doren (1967)
Brenda Lee - for the album For the First Time (1968)
Max Bygraves (1968)
Judi Dench (includes the 'Elsie' verse) - for the London cast recording (1968).
Ella Fitzgerald - included in the 'live' album Ella in Budapest (1970)
Liza Minnelli (includes the 'Elsie' verse) - for the film soundtrack (1972), and for numerous other recordings, including "Liza With a Z" (1972), "Liza Minnelli Live at the Winter Garden" (1974), and "Liza Minnelli at Carnegie Hall" (1987).  On the latter recording, she changed one word of the "Elsie" verse to emphasize her (Liza's) commitment to a drug- and alcohol-free lifestyle.
Vikki Carr (1972)
Mantovani - included in the album An Evening with Mantovani (1973)
Bing Crosby - included in his album At My Time of Life (1976)
Russ Conway included in the album Russ Conway Presents 24 Piano Greats (1977)
Me First and the Gimme Gimmes on their album “Are a Drag” (1999) https://m.youtube.com/watch?v=3o7xfJ08anw
Ashleigh Murray for the Riverdale third season soundtrack (2019)

Chart history
Marilyn Maye

Mike Douglas

Ray Conniff

Herb Alpert

References

External links
 
 
 
 

Songs about Berlin
Songs about theatre
1966 songs
1966 singles
1967 singles
1968 singles
1972 singles
Songs from Cabaret (musical)
Songs with music by John Kander
Songs with lyrics by Fred Ebb
Liza Minnelli songs